Domenico Beceri (active 1527) was an Italian painter active in the Renaissance period, mainly in his hometown of Florence. He was a pupil of Domenico Puligo.

References

16th-century Italian painters
Italian male painters
Painters from Florence
Italian Renaissance painters